Muşat may refer to:

 House of Bogdan-Muşat, the ruling family which established the Principality of Moldova with Bogdan I
 Petru Muşat, the Voivode (prince) of Moldavia from 1375 to 1391
 Roman I Muşat, Voivode of Moldavia from December 1391 to March 1394
 Costea Muşat, Voivode  of Moldavia  between 1373 and 1374
 Simona Muşat, a Romanian  rower
 Nicolae Muşat, a Romanian  football (soccer) Defenfer

Romanian-language surnames